Achille Brice  (born Assoua Achille Brice Eteki in 1984) is a Cameroonian filmmaker, producer and movie director. His work in Life Point was recognized among the 20 of 1,000 movies submitted to contest at l'Étalon d'or de Yennenga at the Pan African Film Festival in Ouagadougou, Burkina Faso. In 2011, he received three nominations as best filmmaker in Cameroon at the Zulu African Film Academy Awards for Obsession, the first Cameroonian English language film to be nominated in the Ecrans Noirs Film Festival for Ecrans D'Afrique Central, Prix Charles Mensa at the CRANS Noir Film Festival. He is the founder of BinAm Studios, an open forum for filmmakers to share and advertise their product.

Early life
Achille was born as Assoua Achille Brice Eteki on April 9, 1984, in Buea. According to a publication on the Music in Africa website, he did his primary and secondary school in Buea and tertiary education at the University College of Technology Southwest Region (Cameroon). Before his career in film, he did music for five years as a recording and solo artist. His debut album was titled Hood Classics. He was noticed as a movie editor in 2003 in the movie Luxury. In 2007, after graduating from UCT, he was admitted to an editing and directing course with Genesis Pictures in Buea.

Career
His professional career started in 2006 with two films nominated at the Verdant Hills Minifilms Festival. The Ancestry Price was selected in short films (2007/2008), A Woman's World (2008/2009) and others. In 2008, he represented Cameroon in the Durban International Film Festival in South Africa. He participated in the Berlinale talent campus as well as the Durban Talent Campus in 2009. He is the owner of BinAm Studios.

Selected filmography 
 Obsession
 The Ancestry Price
 Luxury (2003)
 Leader Gangsters (2005)
 A Man For The Weekend (2017)
 Life.Point (2017)

Awards and recognition

See also 
List of Cameroonian Actors
Cinema of Cameroon

References

External links

Living people
Cameroonian film directors
Cameroonian male actors
1984 births